Scott Barrett may refer to:

 Scott Barrett (footballer) (born 1963), English former professional footballer
 Scott Barrett (political scientist), professor of natural resource economics at Columbia University
 Scott Barrett (politician), Australian politician
 Scott Barrett (rugby union) (born 1993), New Zealand rugby union player